The Pea River Power Company Hydroelectric Facility, on the Pea River in Coffee County, Alabama, near Elba, Alabama, was built in 1911.  The listing includes one contributing building and one contributing structure.

Also, "Along with two other hydroelectric facilities, both completed in 1930 and still in operation, the Elba facility was one of the original hydroelectric generating facilities owned by the Alabama Electric Cooperative. The A.E.C., which began operation in 1944 with aid from the Rural Electric Administration, was the driving force behind the electrification of central and south Alabama."

References

		
National Register of Historic Places in Coffee County, Alabama
Buildings and structures completed in 1911